Lophiotoma ruthveniana is a species of sea snail, a marine gastropod mollusk in the family Turridae, the turrids.

Description
The length of the shell attains 41.5 mm, its diameter 14 mm.

Original description:

Distribution
This marine species occurs off Mauritius.

References

External links
 A.W.B. Powell, The family Turridae in the Indo-Pacific. Part 1. The subfamily Turrinae; Indo-Pacific mollusca, vol. 1 pages: 227--346

ruthveniana
Gastropods described in 1923